Jesse Lazear (December 12, 1804 – September 2, 1877) was a Democratic member of the U.S. House of Representatives from Pennsylvania.

Biography
Lazear was born to Thomas Lazear, Esq., and Elizabeth (Braddock) in Richhill Township, Greene County, Pennsylvania. He received a limited schooling, taught school, and engaged in mercantile pursuits. He served as Recorder of Deeds for Greene County, Pennsylvania, from 1829 to 1832. Lazear was a bank cashier of the Farmers & Drovers' Bank in Waynesburg, Pennsylvania from 1835 to 1867.

Lazear was elected as a Democrat to the Thirty-seventh and Thirty-eighth Congresses. He served as chairman of the United States House Committee on Expenditures on Public Buildings during the Thirty-seventh Congress. He was not a candidate for renomination in 1864. Lazear was a delegate to the Union National Convention at Philadelphia in 1866. He retired to his country home, "Windsor Mill Farm", in Woodlawn, Baltimore County, Maryland, in 1867. He served as president of the Baltimore & Powhatan Railroad Company from 1871 to 1874. Lazear died at his country home in 1877 and was interred in Green Mount Cemetery in Waynesburg.

References

Sources

Jesse Lazear at The Political Graveyard

1804 births
1877 deaths
People from Greene County, Pennsylvania
Democratic Party members of the United States House of Representatives from Pennsylvania
19th-century American politicians